This list of castles in Alsace is a list of medieval castles or château forts in the region in northern France.

Alsace comprises two departments, Bas-Rhin and Haut-Rhin, by the order of which this list is organised.

Bas-Rhin

Haut-Rhin 
Castles of which only vestiges or nothing remains include 
Château d'Altkirch, Château de Meywihr and Château de Wildenstein.

See also
 List of castles in France
 List of châteaux in France

References

 Alsace